Armen Melikyan (born 7 February 1996) is an Armenian Greco-Roman wrestler.

He is representing Armenia in the 2020 Tokyo Olympics, where he will be competing in the 60 kg weight category on August 1.

Career highlights 

 2013 European Junior Champion
 2015 Youth Champion of Armenia
 2016 Youth Champion of Armenia
 2017 Gold Medalist at Senior Championship of Armenia in 60 kg weight category
 2019 Champion at U23 World Championship in Hungary.

References

External links
 
 
 

1996 births
Living people
Wrestlers at the 2020 Summer Olympics
Armenian male sport wrestlers
Olympic wrestlers of Armenia
People from Vagharshapat
European Games competitors for Armenia
Wrestlers at the 2019 European Games